Barmacheh-ye Pain Mahalleh (also Romanized as Barmacheh-ye Pā’īn Maḩal; also known as Barmacheh) is a village in Kateh Sar-e Khomam Rural District, Khomam District, Rasht County, Gilan Province, Iran. At the 2006 census, its population was 538, in 143 families.

References 

Populated places in Rasht County